FC Tom Tomsk is a Russian professional football club, based in the Siberian city of Tomsk. The team plays in Trud Stadium (Tomsk).

History
The team was previously named Burevestnik (1957), Tomich (1958, 1961–1963), Sibelektromotor (1959–1960), Torpedo (1964–1967, 1974–1978), Tomles (1968–1973) and Manometr (1979–1987). The club is currently named after the river of Tom, where Tomsk is located.

In the 1990s the team acquired a number of players that would help them begin their ascent out of the Russian Second Division.  Viktor Sebelev, Valery Konovalov and Ruslan Akhidzhak were key players of the early part of the decade with Sergei Ageyev, Vyacheslav Vishnevskiy and Dmitry Kudinov strengthening the team as they made a run on the division championship. In 1996, the team finished 2nd in the division, just falling short of promotion to the Russian First Division.  In 1997, Tomsk finally achieved a significant goal when they advanced to the First Division with a strong season.

Following promotion, the team acquired a number of new players including Sergei Zhukov, Andrei Talalaev and Mikhail Murashov to help keep the team in the First Division.  However, Tomsk suffered a blow when their newly privatised sponsor, Eastern Oil Company (VNK) pulled out and left the team with no sponsor.  At this point, advancement was a pipe dream with survival in the tougher division becoming a priority.  It was at this point that the team also had to upgrade their stadium to new standards of the league.

The team played middling football for several years until the arrival of a new sponsor brought in much-needed funds and allowed the team to acquire new players and begin to compete.  Third-place finishes in 2002 and 2003 left the team just short of promotion.  However, the 2004 season brought new joy and Tomsk finished second in the division, earning promotion to the Russian Premier League for the 2005 season.  The 2005 season saw Tomsk survive their first year in top-flight football with a 10th-place finish.  In 2006, the team improved its position slightly with an 8th-place finish but in 2007, the club slipped to an 11th-place finish.

The former jersey sponsor Tomskneft, a local subsidiary of Yukos, has recently been sold to new investors. Today, the team is sponsored by the regional authorities.

The club's directors disclosed that the club needed to raise funds or it would go out of business due to debts of 200 million roubles in June 2009.

At the end of the 2018–19 season, they qualified for the Premier League promotion play-offs, but lost to FC Ufa with an aggregate score of 1–2.

In the 2020–21 Russian Football National League, Tom finished in the relegation zone, but remained in the league because two other clubs were disqualified for separate reasons.

Tom failed to receive the license for the 2022–23 FNL season and announced they will apply for the third-tier Russian Football National League 2 license. The FNL2 license was subsequently denied as well due to lack of financial guarantees.

League and cup history

Club records
Largest Margin of Victory — Dynamo Yakutsk – 9–1 (1995), FC Sakhalin Yuzhno-Sakhalinsk – 8–0 (1993), PFC Spartak Nalchik 8–0 (1998)

Largest Margin of Defeat – FC Dynamo Barnaul 0–7 (1962)

All time Leading Scorer –  Viktor Sebelev – 83 goals in 287 matches (1989–2004)

Most goals in a season –  Ruslan Akhidzhak – 18 goals in 21 matches (1994),  Denis Kiselyov – 18 goals in 37 matches (2004)

Reserve squad
A farm club FC Tom-2 Tomsk began competing professionally in the third-tier Russian Professional Football League in the 2014–15 season. The team was dissolved after the 2015–16 season.

Notable players
These players have had international caps for their respective countries. Players whose name is listed in bold represented their countries while playing for Tom.

Russia
 Nikita Bazhenov
 Albert Borzenkov
 Denis Boyarintsev
 Aleksei Bugayev
 Artyom Dzyuba
 Maksim Kanunnikov
 Fyodor Kudryashov
 Denis Laktionov
 Veniamin Mandrykin
 Kirill Panchenko
 Sergei Pesyakov
 Pavel Pogrebnyak
 Igor Portnyagin
 Aleksei Rebko
 Artyom Rebrov
 Sergey Ryzhikov
 Aleksandr Shirko
 Aleksandr Sobolev
 Dmitri Tarasov
 Denis Yevsikov

Former USSR countries
 Artem Simonyan
 Aleksandr Zhidkov
 Syarhey Amelyanchuk
 Maksim Bardachow

 Vital Bulyha
 Dmitri Ekimov
 Egor Filipenko
 Vasily Khomutovsky
 Sergei Kornilenko
 Aliaksandr Kulchiy
 Pavel Nyakhaychyk
 Sergey Sosnovski
 Yan Tigorev
 Syarhey Yaskovich
 Nikoloz Togonidze
 Aleksandr Familtsev
 Valeriu Catînsus
 Ilie Cebanu
 Valeriu Ciupercă
 Serghei Covalciuc
 Eugen Sidorenco
 Oleg Șișchin
 Ilya Blyzniuk
 Kyrylo Kovalchuk
 Denys Onyshchenko
 Pavlo Shkapenko
  Aleksey Polyakov
Europe
 Branislav Krunić
 Ognjen Vranješ

 Zhivko Milanov
 Plamen Nikolov
 Hrvoje Vejić
 Lukáš Droppa
 Martin Jiránek
 Jevgeni Novikov
 Sergei Pareiko
 Norbert Németh
 Ádám Pintér
 Andrius Gedgaudas
 Andrius Skerla
 Goran Maznov
 Mladen Božović
 Eric Bicfalvi
 Ovidiu Dănănae
 Gabriel Mureșan
 Adrian Ropotan
 Pompiliu Stoica
 Garry O'Connor
 Đorđe Jokić
 Kornel Saláta
 Aleksandar Radosavljević

Asia
  Daisuke Matsui
  Kim Nam-Il

References

External links
Club's website 

 
Association football clubs established in 1957
Football clubs in Russia
Sport in Tomsk
1957 establishments in Russia